United States vs. Imperial Petroleum is a federal criminal case in which Imperial Petroleum and others are accused of passing off RIN-stripped B99 as pure biodiesel.

Premise 
On September 19, 2013, Jeffrey T. Wilson, Craig Ducey, Chad Ducey, Brian Carmichael, Joseph Furando, Evelyn Pattison, Caravan Trading LLC, Cima Green LLC, CIMA Energy Group and Imperial Petroleum were indicted in what Joe Hogsett referred to as "the largest instance of tax and securities fraud in state history" (in Indiana).  E-Biofuels of Middletown, Indiana is also under investigation for the case.  Per the Energy Independence and Security Act of 2007, a tax subsidy was offered to the very first person or organization to mix pure biodiesel (B100) with petroleum diesel.  The individuals are accused of fraudulently selling over 130 Megaliters of RIN-stripped B99 to clients who paid an artificially augmented dollar amount while believing that they were acquiring B100 with RINs and a tax subsidy.  Current estimates of the damages to buyers exceeds $100 million USD, much of which is alleged to be spent on automobiles, art and travel.  Wilson and (Craig) Ducey were set to appear in federal court in March 2014.

History 
Robert Dreher of the United States Department of Justice along with Hogsett reported indictments against six people and three companies with respect to renewable fuel program related legal issues.  One other individual was charged, and has agreed to plead guilty and to work with the government.

Case 
Craig Ducey, Chad Ducey, Chris Ducey and Brian Carmichael were in charge of E Biofuels, a manufacturer of biodiesel made using "feedstocks" such as vegetable oil and animal fat.  It is alleged that the Ducey's and Carmichael worked with Joe Furando and Evelyn Katirina Pattison who both led a pair of companies called Caravan Trading Company and CIMA Green to buy RIN-stripped B99 and give the impression that E-Biofuels manufactured the fuel in order to falsely resell it as B100 with RINs coupled with a tax subsidy (acting only as a pass-through establishment).

Ducey & Wilson were sentenced to 74 months and 120 months in jail.

Allegations 
The allegations made are as follows:
 In certain instances, the biodiesel was moved from fuel terminals to the E-Biofuels establishment.  The biodiesel was then placed in tankers and delivered unbeknownst to clients coupled with false documents labeling it as B100 with RINs manufactured by E-Biofuels.
 In other cases, the drivers did not deposit the fuel in Middletown, but instead collected false documents that claimed that the truck contained B100 with RINs that originated in Middletown.
 In the most dire cases, drivers delivered RIN-stripped B99 from fuel terminals directly to clients.  Known as "ghost loads" or "phantom loads", the shipments never saw the E-Biofuels facility.  The accused are claimed to have electronically sent fraudulent documents to drivers en route between the fuel terminals and the client establishments.

See also 
 Energy Independence and Security Act of 2007

References 

2013 in United States case law
Federal court cases involving Indiana
United States district court cases